Mike Nicol is a South African writer and journalist. He was born in 1951 in Cape Town.

Biography 
After completing his studies in Johannesburg, he worked as a journalist for the Leadership magazine.

In 1978, he published Among the Souvenirs, a collection of poems that won the Ingrid Jonker Prize in 1980. Mike Nicol is also one of the major authors of the South African thriller, with Deon Meyer and Roger Smith.

Bibliography

Poetry 
 Among the Souvenirs (1978) Ingrid Jonker Prize 1979
 This Sad Place (1993)

Novels 
 The Powers That Be (1989) 
 This Day and Age (1992) 
 Horseman (1994) 
 The Ibis Tapestry (1998) 
 Payback (2008) 
 Killer Country (2010) 
 Black Heart (2011)
 Out to Score (2006)
 Of Cops & Robbers (2013) 
 Power Play (2015) 
 Agents of the State (2019)
 The Rabbit Hole (2021)

Short stories 
 Bra Henry (1997)

Non fiction 
 A Good-Looking Corpse (1991)
 A Waiting Country. A South African Witness (1994)
 The Invisible Line. The Life and Photography of Ken Oosterbroek (2000)
 Sea-Mountain, Fire City. Living in Cape Town at the Turn of the 20th Century (2001)
 The Firm: a Biography of Webber Wentzel Bowens (2006)
 Mandela. The Authorised Portrait (2006) 
 John Lennon – Imagine (2008)
 Monkey Business. The Murder of Anni Dewani – the facts, the fiction, the spin (2011)
 Mandela. Celebrating the Legacy (2013)

Books for teens 
 Africana Animals (1982)
 What Daddy Loves (2003)

Prize and awards 
 Ingrid Jonker Prize 1979

References 

Living people
1951 births
South African male novelists
20th-century South African novelists
21st-century South African novelists
20th-century South African male writers
21st-century South African male writers